The 2016–17 Greek Basketball Cup was the 42nd edition of Greece's top-tier level professional national domestic basketball cup competition. The competition started on September 17, 2016, and ended with the Final on February 18, 2016. Panathinaikos won the competition.

Format
The top six placed teams from the top-tier level Greek Basket League 2015–16 season, had an automatic bye to the quarterfinals. While the eight lower placed teams from the Greek Basket League 2015–16 season, along with the 16 teams from the 2nd-tier level Greek A2 Basket League 2016–17 season, played in preliminary rounds, competing for the other two quarterfinals places. The quarterfinals and onward rounds were played under a single elimination format.

Bracket

Quarterfinals

Semifinals

Final
The Final started one hour later than planned after Aris fans  tried to break into the Alexandreio Melathron Nick Galis Hall without buying tickets.

Awards

Most Valuable Player

Finals Top Scorer

References

External links
 Official Hellenic Basketball Federation Site 
 Official Greek Basket League Site 
 Official Greek Basket League English website 

Greek Basketball Cup
Cup